Teanum Apulum is an ancient town of Apulia, southeastern Italy, near the modern town of San Paolo di Civitate.

History
The town was called Teate in pre-Roman times, as seen on its numerous ancient coins, which have Oscan legends.
It submitted to Ancient Rome in 318 BC, when it was the primary town of Apulia. Afterwards, it became a  municipium and was renamed Teanum Apulum.

Some ancient Roman ruins and an old bridge over the Fortore river still exist.

References

Roman sites of Apulia
Archaeological sites in Apulia
Former populated places in Italy